Vitali Vladimirovich Ivanov (born February 3, 1976) is a retired Russian handball player who competed in the 2004 Summer Olympics and in the 2008 Summer Olympics.

He was born in Karl-Marx-Stadt, East Germany.

In 2004 he was a member of the Russian team which won the bronze medal in the Olympic tournament. He played all eight matches and scored 20 goals.

Four years later he finished sixth with the Russian team in the 2008 Olympic tournament. He played all eight matches again and scored five goals.

External links
profile

1976 births
Living people
Russian male handball players
Olympic handball players of Russia
Handball players at the 2004 Summer Olympics
Handball players at the 2008 Summer Olympics
Olympic bronze medalists for Russia
Olympic medalists in handball
Medalists at the 2004 Summer Olympics
Moscow State Mining University alumni